The Breguet 19 (Breguet XIX, Br.19 or Bre.19) was a sesquiplane bomber and reconnaissance aircraft which was also used for long-distance flights and was designed by the French Breguet company and produced from 1924.

Development 

The Breguet 19 was designed as a successor to a highly successful World War I Breguet 14 bomber. Initially, it was to be powered by a  Bugatti U-16 engine, driving a four-blade propeller, and a prototype was shown on the 7th Paris Air Show in November 1921 with this engine. A revised design was flown in March 1922 with a single  Renault 12Kb inline engine. After trials, the Breguet 19 was ordered by the French Armys Aéronautique Militaire in September 1923.

Mass production, both for the Aéronautique Militaire and export, began in France in 1924.

Design
The Breguet 19 was a sesquiplane in which the lower wing was substantially smaller than the upper wing, with a conventional layout and braced wings. The fuselage was ellipsoid in cross-section and built up from a frame of duralumin pipes. Breguet made extensive use of duralumin as a construction material which resulted in an unusually light structure for its size, instead of steel or wood. It was faster than other bombers, and even many fighter aircraft which resulted in widespread interest which was further increased by successful record flights. The forward fuselage was covered with duralumin sheets, while the tail, rear fuselage and wings were covered with linen. It had a conventional fixed landing gear with a tail skid. The crew of two, pilot and observer/bombardier, sat in tandem in open cockpits and were provided with dual controls. 

A wide variety of engine types were fitted, mostly water-cooled V-12 or W-12 inline engines, including the following:
Breguet-Bugatti U.16:  - used on Br 19 and Br 23
Farman 12We:  - used on  Br 19-5
Gnome & Rhône 9Ab Jupiter:   used on Br 19 for Yugoslavia
Gnome & Rhône 9C Jupiter:  -  used on Br 19-4
Gnome & Rhône 14Kbrs:  -  used on Br 19-8
Hispano-Suiza 12Ha:  -  used on Br 19
Hispano-Suiza 12Hb:  -  used on Br 19-6, Br 19 B2 and Br 19 CN2 
Hispano-Suiza 12Lb:  -  used on Br 19ter
Hispano-Suiza 12Nb:  -  used on Br 19-7
Hispano-Suiza 12Ybrs:  -  used on Br 19-9
Renault 12Kb:  -  used on Br 19
Renault 12Kd:  - used on  Br 19
Liberty L-12:  - used on  Br 19bis
Lorraine 12Da:  - used on  Br 19
Lorraine-Dietrich 12Db V12:  - used on Br 19
Lorraine-Dietrich 12Eb:  - used on  Br 19
Lorraine-Dietrich 12Ed W12 with reduction gear: - used on Br 19
Lorraine-Dietrich 12Hfrs:  - used on  Br 19-10 and Br 230
Salmson 18Cma:  - used on  Br 19-3

A fixed  Vickers machine gun with an interrupter gear was operated by the pilot, while the observer had twin  Lewis Guns on a gun ring. There was also a fourth machine gun, which could be fired by the observer downwards through an opening in the floor. The Br.19CN2 night fighter variant was fitted with two fixed forward-firing machine guns. The reconnaissance variant could carry 12 x  bombs. The reconnaissance variant had a camera mounting, which was optional on the bomber variant. All variants were equipped radio.

Operational history
The Breguet 19 had its baptism of fire in the Spanish Civil War where it was the mainstay of the Spanish Republican Air Force's (the Government's) bomber fleet.

Greece
In the Greco-Italian War which took place during World War II, 18 Breguets were operational at the outbreak of war, with 1 Observation (or Army Cooperation) Mira, under I Corp Command, based at Perigiali, near Corinth and with 2 Observation Mira under II Corps command, based at Larissa and Kozani. On 4 November 1940, a Royal Hellenic Air Force Breguet from 2 Mira was sent looking for the attacking 3rd Julia Alpine Division, locating it in a mountain pass near Metsovo. Three more Breguets sent to bomb the Italian division were in turn attacked by three Fiat CR.42 fighters. A Breguet was shot down, one crash-landed and the third returned to base, badly damaged.

Variants
Br.19.01 The first Breguet 19 prototype, which first flew in March 1922 which was later bought by the Spanish government.

Br.19.02 was evaluated by Yugoslavia in 1923.

Br.19 A.2Two-seat reconnaissance aircraft.
Br.19 B.2Two-seat light bomber biplane. These first two variants were the most numerous, and were practically identical. They used a variety of engines, the most popular being the  Lorraine-Dietrich 12Db, the  Lorraine-Dietrich 12Eb, the Renault 12K, the Hispano-Suiza 12H and the Farman 12We.
Br.19 CN.2Night fighter version, almost identical to the B2 reconnaissance variant with two additional forward-firing machine guns.
Br.19 GR (Grand Raid) A variant specially modified for long-distance flights, after early long-range attempts were made with the regular Br.19 A2 no.23 fitted with additional fuel tanks.
Br.19 GR 3000 litresIn 1926, three additional aircraft were modified to Br.19 GR 3000 litre specifications. The three aircraft were fitted with different engines: the first one had a  Hispano-Suiza 12Hb, the others had  Renault 12K and  Farman 12Wers engines. It was christened Nungesser et Coli after the two airmen who disappeared in a transatlantic flight attempt in May 1927. A fifth aircraft was built for Greece, called Hellas, with a  Hispano 12Hb. (Other Br.19 aircraft may have received additional fuel tanks for long distance flights, but these were not officially called Br.19 GR. Some sources mention a Belgian Br.19 GR, maybe a confusion with the Belgian Br.19 TR.)

Five were built by Breguet and two by the Spanish company CASA. Three of the French aircraft had a  Hispano-Suiza 12Lb, one had a  Renault 12K, and one had a  Lorraine 12Eb. The first Bidon Hispano was sold to Belgium, and the Bidon Renault was sold to China after a Paris–Beijing flight. The third Bidon Hispano became the French Br.19 TF. The second Spanish Bidon was christened Jesús del Gran Poder, and flew from Sevilla to Bahia (Brazil).

Br.19 TF Super BidonThe last and most advanced long-distance variant, built in 1929, and designed for transatlantic flight. It was powered by a  Hispano-Suiza 12Lb engine, later replaced by a  Hispano-Suiza 12NLb. Another aircraft, with a closed canopy, was built in Spain in 1933. Christened Cuatro Vientos, it flew from Sevilla to Cuba, and disappeared while attempting to reach Mexico.

Br.19 terUtilizing the experience with long-distance variants, this improved reconnaissance variant was developed in 1928, maybe for export purposes. It remained a prototype only (with civilian register F-AIXP).
The first five machines were converted in France for Yugoslavia, then a number were built in Yugoslavia, and a further 50 built in France for export to Turkey.
Br.19.8With a  Wright GR-1820-F-56 Cyclone radial engine, 48 Br.19.7 airframes were eventually completed as Br.19.8's in Yugoslavia.
Br.19.9A single prototype developed in Yugoslavia with a  Hispano-Suiza 12Ybrs engine.
Br.19.10A single prototype developed in Yugoslavia with a  Lorraine-Dietrich 12Hfrs Petrel engine.
Br.19 hydro(Breguet 19 seaplane) Fitted with twin floats as a seaplane, a single prototype (no.1132) was produced for France. Another aircraft sold to Japan was fitted with floats built there by Nakajima.
Nakajima-Breguet Reconnaissance Seaplane Nakajima built Breguet 19-A2B seaplanes.
Br.19T
Br.19T bis
Br.19 Limousine (for six passengers, with a thicker fuselage), but these were never built.
Breguet Br.26T (1926)
Breguet Br.26TSbis
Breguet Br.280T
Breguet Br.281T
Breguet Br.284T

In total, more than 2,000 Breguet 19s were manufactured in France, and about 700 license-built by Spanish CASA, Japanese Nakajima, Belgian SABCA and the Yugoslavian aircraft factory in Kraljevo.

Operators

Argentine Air Force operated 25 Lorraine-Dietrich 12Eb powered aircraft.

Belgian Air Force bought six Br.19 B2s in 1924, and further 146 A2s and B2s were manufactured in under licence by the SABCA works in 1926–30. They were powered with Lorraine-Dietrich 12Eb and Hispano-Suiza 12Ha engines, and used until the late 1930s.

Bolivian Air Force bought ten aircraft and used them during the Chaco war against Paraguay.

Brazilian Air Force operated five aircraft.

Manchurian warlord Zhang Zuolin is claimed to have ordered 70 Breguet 19s, but these were not delivered. Similarly, an order for four Br.19s from the central government was not met. Manchuria did acquire a single Br.19A2 in 1926 and a Br.19.GR in 1929.

Zrakoplovstvo Nezavisne Države Hrvatske seized 46 aircraft used for anti-partizan missions.

 The French Armys Aéronautique Militaire operated its first Breguet 19s in the A2 variant from the autumn of 1924, the B2 variant from June 1926, then the fighter C2 and CN2 variants. In the late 1920s and early 1930s, they were the most numerous French combat aircraft. In metropolitan France, they were withdrawn from service in the early 1930s; the last Br.19 CN2 was withdrawn in 1935. Until 1938, they were still used by the French Air Force (successor to the Aéronautique Militaire) in colonies in the Middle East and North Africa - among others, they were used there to suppress native rebellions.
French Navy

Hellenic Air Force acquired 30 Breguet 19 A2s and some were used against invading Italian forces in 1940, delivering valuable information on Italian movements.

Regia Aeronautica bought one aircraft for tests.

In April 1925, the factory Nakajima Hikoki KK acquired two aircraft. The purchase was the work of the well-known promoter of aviation, the Asahi Shinbun newspaper group. A production license was acquired.  Nakajima offered a float-equipped version to the navy, and another was entered into a competition for maritime reconnaissance, but was unsuccessful.  One plane flew again with wheeled undercarriage and civilian designation J-BBFO as a mail plane.
 Iran
Iranian Air Force operated two aircraft.

Polish Air Force bought 250 Breguet 19 A2s and B2s, with  Lorraine-Dietrich 12Eb engines, in 1925–30. 20 aircraft were reportedly the longer-range reconnaissance variant, but details are not known. the first Br.19 entered Polish service in 1926, but most were delivered in 1929–30. They were withdrawn from combat units in 1932–37, and used in training units until 1939. They were not used in combat during the Invasion of Poland of 1939 and most were destroyed on the ground.

Royal Romanian Air Force bought 50 Breguet 19 A2s and B2s in 1927, then 108 Br.19 B2s, and five Br.19.7's in 1930. They were in service until 1938.

Soviet Air Force bought one aircraft for tests.
 Kingdom of Spain &  Spanish Republic
Aeronáutica Militar bought a prototype and a license in 1923, and started production in the CASA| works, in A2 and B2 variants. The first 19 aircraft were imported, the next 26 completed from French parts, then 177 were manufactured (50 of them had Hispano-Suiza engine, the rest the Lorraine-Dietrich 12Eb engine). The Breguet 19 was the basic equipment of Spanish bomber and reconnaissance units until the initial period of the Spanish Civil War. In July 1936, there were less than hundred in service in the Spanish Republican Air Force. They were actively used as bombers during the war, especially on the government's side. In 1936, the Nationalists bought an additional twenty from Poland through the SEPEWE syndicate. With an advent of more modern fighters, the Br.19 suffered many losses, and after 1937 were withdrawn from frontline service. The Republican side lost 28 aircraft, and Nationalists lost 10 (including 2 Republican and 1 Nationalist aircraft, that deserted). The remaining aircraft were used for training until 1940.

Turkish Air Force bought 20 Br.19 B2s, then 50 Br.19.7s in 1932. Some of these aircraft were used in bombardment and reconnaissance missions during the Dersim Rebellion.

Royal Air Force bought one aircraft for tests.

Uruguayan Air Force

Venezuelan Air Force operated 12 aircraft.

Yugoslav Royal Air Force bought 100 Br.19 A2s in 1924, and in 1927 acquired a license to manufacture them in a new factory in Kraljevo. The first batch of 85 aircraft were assembled from French parts, and a further 215 were built from scratch. The first 150 aircraft in Yugoslavian service had Lorraine-Dietrich engines, the next 150 –  Hispano-Suiza 12Hb engines, and the last 100 –  Gnome-Rhone Jupiter 9Ab radial engines. From 1932, the Br.19.7 variant was manufactured – the first five were built in France, the next 75 in Kraljevo (51 according to other publications), and a further 48 aircraft, lacking engines, were completed in 1935–1937 as Br.19.8's, with  Wright Cyclone radial engines. (Some publications give different numbers of Yugoslavian Bre.19s). Some of these Yugoslavian aircraft were used in combat after the German attack on Yugoslavia in 1941.

SFR Yugoslav Air Force operated one Croatian Br.19 taken by its pilot and delivered to the partisans of Tito, and used in June–July 1942, until it was shot down. Another two, captured by the new Communist government forces in April 1945, were used to pursue Ustashes.

Record variants
Both standard and modified Breguet 19s were used for numerous record-breaking flights. The first was the Br.19 prototype, which won a military aircraft speed contest in Madrid on 17 February 1923. On 12 March 1923, it also set an international altitude record of  carrying a  load. It was later bought by the Spanish government.

Many crews made long-distance flights in Br.19s. Two Br.19 A2s were bought by the Japanese Asahi Shimbun newspaper and fitted with additional fuel tanks. They were flown by H. Abe and K. Kawachi on the Tokyo-Paris-London route in July 1925, covering . Between 27 August and 25 September 1926, the Polish crew of Boleslaw Orlinski flew the Warsaw-Tokyo route and back, in a modified Br.19 A2, despite the fact that one of its lower wings was broken on the way. On 8 June 1928 a modified Greek Br.A2 ("ΕΛΛΑΣ" en: Hellas), flown by C. Adamides and E. Papadakos, embarked on a long distance tour around the Mediterranean landing without incident at Tatoi airfield, Athens, on 1 July. Between 1927 and 1930, Romanian, Yugoslavian and Polish Br.19s were often used in Little Entente air races.

Breguet 19 GRs and TRs set several world records, mostly of long-distance non-stop flights, starting with Arrachart and Lemaitre's  flight from Paris to Villa Cisneros in 24½ hours on 2–3 February 1925. From 10 October 1927 – 14 April 1928, Costes and Le Brix flew a Br.19 GR (named Nungesser-Coli) around the world, covering  - though the journey between San Francisco and Tokyo was taken by ship.

The Super Bidon was created especially for the purpose of a transatlantic flight. It was named Point d'Interrogation ("The Question Mark"). Then on 1–2 September 1930, they flew from Paris to New York City, a distance of  making the first non-stop east-west crossing of the North Atlantic by a fixed-wing aircraft. The second Super Bidon, the Spanish Cuatro Vientos, vanished over Mexico with M. Barberan and J. Collar Serra, after a transatlantic flight from Seville to Cuba on 10–11 June 1933.

Specifications (Br 19 A.2)

Surviving aircraft 
 Breguet Br.19 GR no.1685 Nungesser et Coli, in the Musée de l'Air et de l'Espace of Le Bourget, near Paris (not in public display as of 2009)
 CASA Br.19 TR Bidon Jesús del Gran Poder, in the Museo del Aire, Cuatro Vientos, Madrid
 Breguet Br.19 TF Super Bidon Point d'Interrogation, in the Musée de l'Air et de l'Espace (restored, on public display)

See also
The Breguet XIX played a central role in Nevil Shute's second published work "So Disdained".

References

Notes

Bibliography

 
 
 
 

Racing aircraft
1920s French bomber aircraft
1920s French military reconnaissance aircraft
 0019
Single-engined tractor aircraft
Sesquiplanes
Aircraft first flown in 1922